Sir John William Lubbock, 2nd Baronet FRS (26 August 1774 – 22 October 1840) was an English banker.

Born on 27 December 1773, as the only surviving son of William Lubbock of Lamas, Norfolk to Anne, daughter of Thomas Woodrow of Hobis, Norfolk. He was educated in Charterhouse, 1786–91. On 1 August 1799, he married Mary, daughter of James Entwistle, merchant, of Rusholme, Manchester, Lancashire. His uncle and mentor was Sir John Lubbock, the 1st Baronet, who in 1772 became a partner in the London bank of Lemon, Buller, Finlay and Lubbock first at No 14 Abchurch Lane, then of Mansion House Street. In 1785 the partnership changed to Forster, Lubbock and Bosanquet and in 1801 to Forster, Lubbock, Forster and Clarke. Finally in 1814 it was Lubbock & Co., of which John William Lubbock, the principal's nephew, became the second partner. He succeeded his uncle to the baronetage upon the latter's death on 24 February 1816.

Lubbock chaired the family bank Lubbock & Company. He was ultimately succeeded by his son John William Lubbock (FRS 1829), who later oversaw the merger in 1860 of Lubbock & Co. with Roberts & Co., becoming Roberts, Lubbock & Company.

Lubbock was the Member of Parliament (MP) for Leominster from 1812 to 1820. He was grandfather of John Lubbock, 1st Baron Avebury (FRS 1858) and great-grandfather of Basil Lubbock.

References

External links 
 

1774 births
1840 deaths
English bankers
Baronets in the Baronetage of the United Kingdom
Members of the Parliament of the United Kingdom for English constituencies
UK MPs 1812–1818
UK MPs 1818–1820
Fellows of the Royal Society
John